San José de los Molinos District is one of fourteen districts of the province Ica in Peru.

References

1876 establishments in Peru